Mukinbudin is a small town in the north eastern Wheatbelt region of Western Australia, approximately  east of Perth and  north of Merredin near Lake Campion. It is the main town in the Shire of Mukinbudin. At the 2021 Australian census, Mukinbudin had a population of 336.

In 1910 the first of the farmers arrived to commence wheat growing on their  blocks and it was some time before they added stock to what had been entirely a wheat growing enterprise. An extension of the Mount Marshall railway line to Mukinbudin and Lake Brown was approved in 1922 and opened in October 1923. The town site was gazetted in 1922.

In 1932 the Wheat Pool of Western Australia announced that the town would have two grain elevators, each fitted with an engine, installed at the railway siding.

The surrounding areas produce wheat and other cereal crops. The town is a receival site for Cooperative Bulk Handling.

The town was hit by a wild storm in February 2011 and was lashed by strong winds with gusts over 125 km/h, large hailstones and experienced some flooding. Dozens of power poles and hundreds of trees were blown over and parts of roads were washed away.

Politics
Polling place statistics are shown below showing the votes from Mukinbudin in the federal and state elections as indicated.

Notable people
 Mark Seaby – AFL footballer
 Rowan Jones – AFL footballer
 Todd Menegola – AFL footballer

References

External links

Shire of Mukinbudin

Mukinbudin
Wheatbelt (Western Australia)
Grain receival points of Western Australia